

Ainaži Lighthouse (Latvian: Ainažu bāka) is a lighthouse located in Ainaži on the Bay of Riga - of the Baltic Sea.

History 
The Ainahi lighthouse was built in 1930, originally serving as a guide for the nearby Ainaži port and harbour. During World War II, the harbour was bombarded by German bombers; causing the village to lose its processing factory and fishing importance - therefore making the lighthouse insignificant. The village, port and harbour were rebuilt under Soviet control - bringing back the importance of the lighthouse. The lighthouse was reconstructed and furthermore renovated in the 1990s. Currently the lighthouse is open to the public and is a key landmark for the nearby villages.

See also
 List of lighthouses in Latvia

References

External links

Lighthouses completed in 1930
Resort architecture in Latvia
Lighthouses in Latvia